Sanxay is a district (muang) of Attapeu province in southern Laos.

References

Districts of Attapeu province